MFC Mykolaiv-2 is the 2nd squad of the Ukrainian football club MFC Mykolaiv.

History
History of the MFC Mykolaiv second team could be easily traced to the 1937 Football Championship of the Ukrainian SSR where Sudnobudivnyk-2 Mykolaiv placed 6th out 7 participants.

Until 2017, the team played in various amateur level competitions. In 2017, it was admitted to the Ukrainian Second League. Its first game at professional level the team played on 16 July 2017 hosting SC Tavriya Simferopol at Tsentralny Misky Stadion in Mykolaiv. Its home stadium was announced Stadion Parka Peremohy.

Before the 2018–19 season, the team squad was refreshed with younger players from local Torpedo sports school of Olympic reserve.

Current squad

Coaches
 2017 – 2019 Vyacheslav Mazarati
 2019 – present Volodymyr Ponomarenko

League and cup history

Soviet Union
{|class="wikitable"
|-bgcolor="#efefef"
! Season
! Div.
! Pos.
! Pl.
! W
! D
! L
! GS
! GA
! P
!Domestic Cup
!colspan=2|Europe
!Notes
|-
|align=center|1937
|align=center|4th
|align=center|6
|align=center|6
|align=center|1
|align=center|2
|align=center|3
|align=center|6
|align=center|14
|align=center|10
|align=center|
|align=center|
|align=center|
|align=center|
|-
|align=center|1939
|align=center|4th
|align=center|10
|align=center|9
|align=center|1
|align=center|3
|align=center|5
|align=center|8
|align=center|23
|align=center|14
|align=center|
|align=center|
|align=center|
|align=center|
|-
|align=center|1946
|align=center|4th South
|align=center|5
|align=center|14
|align=center|6
|align=center|1
|align=center|7
|align=center|22
|align=center|29
|align=center|13
|align=center|
|align=center|
|align=center|
|align=center|
|-
|align=center|1947
|align=center|4th "Group 3"
|align=center|2
|align=center|
|align=center|
|align=center|
|align=center|
|align=center|
|align=center|
|align=center|
|align=center|
|align=center|
|align=center|
|align=center|
|-
|align=center|1948
|align=center|4th "Group 7"
|align=center|2
|align=center|
|align=center|
|align=center|
|align=center|
|align=center|
|align=center|
|align=center|
|align=center|
|align=center|
|align=center|
|align=center|
|-
|align=center|1949
|align=center|4th "Group 7"
|align=center|6
|align=center|
|align=center|
|align=center|
|align=center|
|align=center|
|align=center|
|align=center|
|align=center|
|align=center|
|align=center|
|align=center|
|-
|}

Ukraine
{|class="wikitable"
|-bgcolor="#efefef"
! Season
! Div.
! Pos.
! Pl.
! W
! D
! L
! GS
! GA
! P
!Domestic Cup
!colspan=2|Europe
!Notes
|-
|align=center|2017–18
|align=center|3rd
|align=center|9
|align=center|33
|align=center|10
|align=center|7
|align=center|16
|align=center|41
|align=center|58
|align=center|37
|align=center|
|align=center|
|align=center|
|align=center|
|-
|align=center|2018–19
|align=center|3rd
|align=center|9
|align=center|27
|align=center|5
|align=center|5
|align=center|17
|align=center|22
|align=center|52
|align=center|20
|align=center|
|align=center|
|align=center|
|align=center|
|-
|align=center|2019–20
|align=center|3rd
|align=center|
|align=center|
|align=center|
|align=center|
|align=center|
|align=center|
|align=center|
|align=center|
|align=center|
|align=center|
|align=center|
|align=center|
|-
|}

References 

MFC Mykolaiv
1937 establishments in Ukraine
Ukrainian reserve football teams
Football clubs in Mykolaiv